Phuti may refer to:

People 
 Phuti Mahanyele (born c. 1971), a South African business executive
 Phuti Lekoloane (born c. 1991), a South African footballer and LGBTQ activist
 Lako Phuti Bhutia (born 1994), an Indian women footballer

Places 
 Phuti Masjid, a mosque in Kumarpur, India

See also 
 Puti (disambiguation)
 Putti (disambiguation)
 Putty (disambiguation)
 Potti (disambiguation)
 Putte (disambiguation)